is a former freestyle swimmer from Japan, who won the bronze medal in the 4 × 100 m Medley Relay at the 2000 Summer Olympics in Sydney, Australia. Her winning teammates in that race were Mai Nakamura, Junko Onishi, and Masami Tanaka. She competed in two consecutive Summer Olympics, starting in 1996.

References 

 databaseOlympics
 Profile on FINA-site

1979 births
Living people
Olympic swimmers of Japan
Swimmers at the 1996 Summer Olympics
Swimmers at the 2000 Summer Olympics
Olympic bronze medalists for Japan
World record setters in swimming
Olympic bronze medalists in swimming
World Aquatics Championships medalists in swimming
Medalists at the FINA World Swimming Championships (25 m)
Asian Games medalists in swimming
Medalists at the 2000 Summer Olympics
Asian Games gold medalists for Japan
Asian Games silver medalists for Japan
Asian Games bronze medalists for Japan
Japanese female freestyle swimmers
Medalists at the 1994 Asian Games
Medalists at the 1998 Asian Games
Swimmers at the 1994 Asian Games
Swimmers at the 1998 Asian Games
20th-century Japanese women